Events from 2011 in Catalonia.

Incumbents
 President of the Generalitat of Catalonia – Artur Mas

Events
 25 September – Bullfighting fans see the last fights before a ban on the age-old tradition comes into effect.

See also

 2011 in Spain

References